Rakotonirina is a Malagasy surname.

People
 Manandafy Rakotonirina (1938 - 2019), Malagasy politician
 Jean-Claude Rakotonirina, Malagasy politician
 Harijaona Lovanantenaina Rakotonirina, Malagasy politician
 Joe Ernest Rakotonirina, Malagasy politician

Malagasy-language surnames
Surnames of Malagasy origin
de:Rakotonirina
fr:Rakotonirina